The Albatros G.I, (post-war company designation L.4), was a four-engined German biplane bomber of World War I.

Development
Founded on 27 April 1914 the Ostdeutsche Albatroswerke G.m.b.H. at Schneidemühl by
Otto Wiener and Dr. Walter Huth, the OAW maintained close ties with Albatros, remaining an independent
company until October 1917. The majority of  OAWs work involved licence manufacture of products from the parent Albatros company.

Given the company designation L4, one of the few homegrown designs was the Albatros G.I a four-engined heavy bomber inspired by the Sikorsky Ilya Muromets. The G.I was of typical construction for 1915, with wooden structure, wire-braced and covered with fabric and four engines mounted in nacelles on the lower wing upper surface.

First flown on 31 January 1916 by Alexander Hipleh, flight trials revealed not only poor flying qualities, but also poor performance, which resulted in further development being abandoned. The later G.II and G.III were not directly related to the G.I, being twin-engined, a lot lighter and having completely different wing designs.

Specifications (G.I)

See also

References

G.I
1910s German bomber aircraft
Aircraft first flown in 1916